"Water Runs Dry" is a 1995 single by Boyz II Men for the Motown label, written and produced by Babyface. The single, the fourth released from the album II, reached number two in the United States and number four in the Canada. It also contains a version of the group's previous number one hit from the same album, "I'll Make Love to You". A Spanish version, "No dejemos que muera el amor", was also recorded and peaked at number 10 on the US Latin Pop Airplay chart.

Music video
In a 2019 interview with the Grammys, Nathan Morris said the music video was one of his two favorites out of all the videos the group had ever made. Directed by Wayne Isham, it was filmed at White Sands National Park in New Mexico.

Synopsis
The music video features a woman (played by Tyra Banks) walking through a desert setting and holding a glass ball. The camera zooms in on the ball to reveal an aerial view, from a helicopter, of Boyz II Men standing atop a sand dune inside the ball. Shots of a string orchestra and guitarist playing along are interspersed throughout as the group sings the song. Clips of both the woman and the group walking and running across the dunes are also shown. Some scenes feature a rippling effect that mimics water. The video ends with the woman holding the glass ball once again and the camera panning out to show her watching the group walk away inside it.

Reception
In a brief throwback-to-1995 piece, Essence magazine jokingly commented that the video "has more white-on-white sets than, well, the Essence Festival", but also said that it was "full of more 90s goodness" and concluded with "We love it". Pop culture website Vulture listed the outfits worn in the video by Boyz II Men as one of the forty "matchiest" of their careers, stating that the group's clothes, like their music, were "always harmonious".

The music video received two MTV VMA nominations for Best Cinematography and Best R&B Video at the 1995 MTV Video Music Awards but did not win. It was additionally nominated for Best R&B/Soul Single – Group, Band or Duo at the 1996 Soul Train Music Awards, but lost to TLC's "Waterfalls.

Live performances 
Boyz II Men performed an acoustic rendition of "Water Runs Dry" at the 1995 MTV Movie Awards. They later headlined the "Budweiser Superfest" concert series that ran from July through August of that year, and performed the song as part of the setlist for each show. In 2018, the group was one of the opening acts for Bruno Mars on five dates (between September–October) of the second North-American leg of his 24K Magic World Tour, and performed the song during their appearances.

Track listings

US Remixes
"Water Runs Dry" (Strat Mix Edit) – 3:53
"Water Runs Dry" (Strat Mix) – 4:51
"Water Runs Dry" (Mood Mix Edit) – 4:10
"Water Runs Dry" (Mood Mix) – 4:44
"Water Runs Dry" (LP Version) – 3:21

US Maxi-CD
"Water Runs Dry" (LP Version) – 3:21
"Water Runs Dry" (Mood Mix) – 4:43
"Water Runs Dry" (Strat Mix) – 4:51
"Water Runs Dry" (Groove Mix) – 4:30
"Water Runs Dry" (Bump Mix) – 4:38

US Vinyl, 12-inch, Promo
A-side
"Water Runs Dry" (LP Version) – 3:21
"Water Runs Dry" (Mood Mix) – 4:43
"Water Runs Dry" (Instrumental) – 3:21
B-side
"Water Runs Dry" (Strat Mix) – 4:51
"Water Runs Dry" (Groove Mix) – 4:30
"Water Runs Dry (Acapella) – 3:21

UK Maxi-CD
"Water Runs Dry" (Strat Mix Edit) – 4:00
"Water Runs Dry" (LP Version) – 3:21
"Water Runs Dry" (Mood Mix) – 4:43
"I'll Make Love To You" (Pop Edit) – 3:49

UK Vinyl, 12-inch, Promo
A-side
"Water Runs Dry" (Strat Mix) – 3:21
"Water Runs Dry" (Mood Mix) – 4:43
"Water Runs Dry" (Bump Mix) – 3:21
B-side
"Water Runs Dry" (LP Version) – 4:51
"Water Runs Dry" (Groove Mix) – 4:30
"I'll Make Love to You" (I Wanna Make Love to You Version) – 3:21

Credits and personnel 
Adapted from Tidal.
 Boyz II Menprimary vocals
 Babyfacesongwriting, production
 Colin Heldtimmersive mix engineering
 Reggie Hamiltonstring arrangement

Charts

Weekly charts

Year-end charts

Certifications

Renditions
In 1998, contemporary jazz guitarist Chuck Loeb covered the song for his album The Moon, the Stars and the Setting Sun.

American cover band Boyce Avenue released an acoustic version of the song in 2010.

Contemporary Christian artist The Katinas covered the song for their 2013 album Love Chapter.

American singer Kelly Clarkson performed a stripped-down version of the song, accompanied by only a guitarist, on the June 7, 2021 episode of her daytime television talk show The Kelly Clarkson Show, during the "Kellyoke" segment.

Notes

References

1994 songs
1995 singles
Boyz II Men songs
Motown singles
Music videos directed by Wayne Isham
Song recordings produced by Babyface (musician)
Songs written by Babyface (musician)